A baby shower is a party for an expecting mother.

Baby shower or Baby Shower may also refer to:

 "Baby Shower", an episode of The Office
 "The Baby Shower" (Seinfeld)
 "The Baby Shower" (SATC episode)